American actress Marcia Cross has appeared in a variety of television and film productions, most notably as Bree Van de Kamp in the ABC soap opera Desperate Housewives (20042012), for which she twice consecutive won the Screen Actors Guild Award for Outstanding Performance by an Ensemble in a Comedy Series and was also nominated for an Emmy, three Golden Globes and two Satellite Awards.

Filmography

Television series

Television films

Feature films

Awards and nominations

References

External links 
 

Actress filmographies
American filmographies
Lists of awards received by American actor